Llauta District is one of twenty-one districts of the Lucanas Province in Peru.

Geography 
Other mountains are listed below:

References